Cavanaugh v. Ulster Weaving Ltd., (1960) A.C. 145 and A.C. (1959) 2 All E.R. (H.L.) is a legal judgment in a tort case decided by the Judicial Committee of the House of Lords, clarifying the test for negligence by finding  that evidence of trade practices is insufficient to prove absence of negligence of employer's duties on the facts.

An employer's duty towards its employees was expressed by Lord Somervell of Harrow as follows: "put in its simplest terms the general scope of the duty of an employer is a duty to take reasonable care in all circumstances."

Facts of the case

Rule in the case

References

1959 in case law
House of Lords cases
United Kingdom tort case law
1959 in British law